Tracy Lamar Davis (born April 27, 1966), better known by his stage name Big Tray Deee (formerly Tray Deee and Tracy Deee), is an American rapper signed with Snoop Dogg's label Dogghouse Records.

Career

Before becoming a rapper, Davis was an active gang member. Tray Deee is a member of the Insane Crips Gang in Long Beach, California. Tray Deee made his first appearance on Snoop Doggy Dogg's Murder Was the Case soundtrack in 1994, guest starring on the track "21 Jumpstreet", Tray Dee also featured on the song Reality off the Doggfood album in 1995, followed by an appearance on Tha Doggfather in 1996. In 1999, he joined the Platinum-selling group Tha Eastsidaz, which consisted of himself, Snoop Dogg and Goldie Loc. The group released two albums. Simultaneously and after the Eastsidaz project he was affiliated with car club-street band the IV Life Family. He later signed to the related record label IV Life Records.

In 2014, Tray Deee announced his intention to release his debut solo album, following a series of mixtapes. The first of these mixtapes, Long Beach State of Mind Vol. I, was recorded while Tray Deee was incarcerated, on a smart phone in a makeshift vocal booth made from blankets and boxes in his cell. On April 18 and 19, Tray Deee reunited with Goldie Loc to perform at "Krush Groove 2014" at Save Mart Center in Fresno and The Forum in Inglewood. On July 15, Snoop Dogg released his mixtape That's My Work Vol. 4 which features both Goldie Loc and Tray Deee. On April 27, 2015, he released a single "On the Blocc" along with official music video, the single was produced by Nat Powers. Tray Deee has stated that it is unlikely that there will ever be another Eastsidaz album.

Legal issues

On February 2, 2005, he was sentenced to twelve years in prison for attempted murder, stemming from a 2003 incident in which he fired at rival gang members. He was imprisoned at California Men's Colony in San Luis Obispo, California for nine years. He was released from prison on April 3, 2014.

Discography

Studio albums
Solo
 The General's List (2002)
 The 3rd Coming (2016)
 The General's List II (2018)
 The Certified Project (2019)

Tha Eastsidaz (Big Tray Deee with Goldie Loc & Snoop Dogg)
 Tha Eastsidaz (2000)
 Duces 'n Trayz: The Old Fashioned Way (2001)

Other collaborations
 Haven't You Heard... (2011) (with LBC Crew)
 We Got Now and Next (2016) (with Tha Chill, Kurupt & Weazel Loc, as Diirty OGz)

Mixtapes
 Long Beach State of Mind Vol. I: The Mixtape (2014)
 That's My Work Vol. 4 (2014) (with Tha Eastsidaz)
 Long Beach State of Mind Vol. II: Street Officials (2016)

Singles
As lead artist

As featured artist

Promotional singles

Guest appearances
{| class="wikitable plainrowheaders" style="text-align:center;"
|+ List of non-single guest appearances, with other performing artists, showing year released and album name
! scope="col" style="width:19em;" | Title
! scope="col" | Year
! scope="col" | Other artist(s)
! scope="col" | Album
|-
! scope="row"| "21 Jumpstreet"
|| 1994
| Snoop Dogg
| Murder Was the Case
|-
! scope="row"| "Reality"
|| 1995
| Tha Dogg Pound
| Dogg Food
|-
! scope="row"| "(O.J.) Wake Up"
| rowspan="2"| 1996
| Snoop Dogg
| rowspan="2"| Tha Doggfather
|-
! scope="row"| "Downtown Assassins"
| Snoop Dogg, Daz Dillinger
|-
! scope="row"| "Bag o' Weed"
| rowspan="6"| 1997
| Nate Dogg
| G-Funk Classics, Vol. 1
|-
! scope="row"| "Get Money"
| DJ Pooh, Charlie Wilson, Threat
| rowspan="2"| Bad Newz Travels Fast
|-
! scope="row"| "Gangsta Vocabulary"
| DJ Pooh, Threat
|-
! scope="row"| "East Side Madness"
| Swoop G, T-Luni
| Undisputed
|-
! scope="row"| "Hollywood Bank Robbery"
| Tha Dogg Pound, Snoop Dogg
| rowspan="2"| Gang Related soundtrack
|-
! scope="row"| "Gang Related"
| Daz Dillinger, CJ Mac, WC
|-
! scope="row"| "My Life"
| rowspan="11"| 1998
| Storm, Big Syke, Val Young
| 
|-
! scope="row"| "Oh No"
| Daz Dillinger, J-Money
| Retaliation, Revenge & Get Back
|-
! scope="row"| "All Aboard"
| Twinz
| rowspan="4"| Straight Outta Cali
|-
! scope="row"| "King Pin"
| J-Money, Kurupt, Crooked I 
|-
! scope="row"| "It's Goin' Down"
| J-Money, Legacy, Shorty K
|-
! scope="row"| "Don't Test Me"
| Sho Shot, Bo-Roc, J-Money, Crooked I, Legacy
|-
! scope="row"| "Way Too Crazy"
| Daz Dillinger, Jayo Felony
| Rush Hour soundtrack
|-
! scope="row"| "Everythang Happens fo' a Reason"
| Bad Azz
| Word on tha Streets
|-
! scope="row"| "C-Walk"
| Kurupt, Slip Capone
| Kuruption!
|-
! scope="row"| "Gangsta Shit's Like a Drug"
| Mack 10, Squeak Ru
| The Recipe
|-
! scope="row"| "One More Lick"
| TQ
| They Never Saw Me Coming
|-
! scope="row"| "Turf Stories"
| rowspan="5"| 1999
| Mac Shawn, Daz Dillinger
| Turf Stories
|-
! scope="row"| "Hell Ya"
| Soopafly
| Whiteboys soundtrack
|-
! scope="row"| "Throw It Up"
| Rappin' 4-Tay, Snoop Dogg, Roger Troutman
| Introduction to Mackin'''
|-
! scope="row"| "Neva Gonna Give It Up"
| Kurupt, 213, Soopafly 
| rowspan="2"| Tha Streetz Iz a Mutha|-
! scope="row"| "It Ain't About You"
| Kurupt, Soopafly, Latoya Williams
|-
! scope="row"| "Ta Get n"
|rowspan="5"| 2000
| C-Lim
| What Dat 'N' Like|-
! scope="row"| "I'd Rather Lie 2 Ya"
| Daz Dillinger, Kurupt
| rowspan="3"| R.A.W.|-
! scope="row"| "U Ain't Know'n"
| Daz Dillinger
|-
! scope="row"| "Baccstabber"
| Daz Dillinger, Mark Morrison
|-
! scope="row"| "Ride or Die"
| Spice 1, Yukmouth, Jayo Felony
| The Playa Rich Project|-
! scope="row"| "Fuck with Us"
| rowspan="3"| 2001
| Kurupt, Xzibit
| Bones soundtrack
|-
! scope="row"| "Eastside"
| Snoop Dogg, Daz Dillinger
| Death Row's Snoop Doggy Dogg Greatest Hits|-
! scope="row"| "Kick Rocks"
| Ras Kass
| 
|-
! scope="row"| "G's & Hustlas"
| rowspan="4"| 2002
| C-Bo
| Life as a Rider|-
! scope="row"| "Thuggin'"
| Spice 1, Kokane
| Spiceberg Slim|-
! scope="row"| "Nuthin' Has Changed"
| King Tee, Kool G Rap
| The Kingdom Come|-
! scope="row"| "Born to Die"
| Foesum, Twinz
| The Foefathers|-
! scope="row"| "Game"
| rowspan="2"| 2003
| 40 Glocc, Spice 1
| The Jakal|-
! scope="row"| "L.A. Streetz from L.B. 2 Compton"
| Mausberg, Misery
| The Compton Blockz|-
! scope="row"| "Thou Shall Not Kill"
| rowspan="1"| 2007
| Mobb Deep, Snoop Dogg
| The Infamous Archives|-
! scope="row"| "License to Kill"
| rowspan="1"| 2015
| DJ Kay Slay, Sammi J, Gunplay, Trae tha Truth, Big K.R.I.T.
| The Industry Purge|-
! scope="row"| "Anybody Killa"
| rowspan="3"| 2016
| Kokane, Cold 187um, Xzibit
| King of G-funk|-
! scope="row"| "Eyez Open"
| Young Noble & Deuce Deuce, Bad Azz
| The Code|-
! scope="row"| "Don't Make Me"
| Outlawz
| Livin Legendz|-
! scope="row"| "Bacc in da Dayz"
|| 2017
| Snoop Dogg
| Neva Left|-
! scope="row"| "Ghetto Bird"
|| 2018
| Daz Dillinger, Freddie Gibbs
| Dazamataz|}

FilmographyA Thin Line Between Love and Hate (1996) - HimselfBaby Boy (2001) - KnuckleheadThe Wash (2001) - Thug #3Tha Eastsidaz'' (1999/2000) - Crackle

References 

1966 births
Living people
21st-century American rappers
African-American rappers
American people convicted of attempted murder
American prisoners and detainees
Crips
Death Row Records artists
Gangsta rappers
G-funk artists
Musicians from Long Beach, California
Musicians from Natchez, Mississippi
Prisoners and detainees of California